Ecmel Kutay (1927 – 17 March 1998) was a general in the Turkish military and the 24th mayor of Istanbul. He served in the post from 1981 to 1982.

References

Turkish Military Academy alumni
Army War College (Turkey) alumni
Turkish Army generals
Mayors of Istanbul
1927 births
1998 deaths